Khooni Laash is a Bollywood film. It was released in 1943.

Plot

Cast

References

External links
 

1943 films
1940s Hindi-language films
Indian black-and-white films